Olivier Thill (born 17 December 1996) is a Luxembourgian professional footballer who plays as a midfielder for Turkish club Eyüpspor.

Club career
As a senior player, Thill started playing club football for FC Progrès Niederkorn from 2015 to 2018.

On 31 August 2018, he signed a four-year contract with the Russian Premier League club FC Ufa. Three weeks before that, he scored a goal for his previous club Progrès against FC Ufa in the Europa League qualifier. On 17 October 2020, his contract with Ufa was terminated by mutual consent.

On 30 December 2020, Ukrainian Premier League side Vorskla Poltava announced that they had signed a 2-year deal with Thill.

On 7 March 2022, FIFA announced that, due to the Russian invasion of Ukraine, all the contracts of foreign players in Ukraine are suspended until 30 June 2022 and they are allowed to sign with clubs outside Ukraine until that date. On 30 March 2022, Thill signed with Turkish club Eyüpspor until 30 June 2022 using the new rule.

International career
Thill made his international debut for the Luxembourg national team in 2017.

Personal life
Olivier is the brother of Sébastien Thill and Vincent Thill. Sébastien plays for Hansa Rostock, while Vincent is on the books at Vorskla Poltava. The three are the sons of former international footballer Serge Thill.

Career statistics

International
Scores and results list Luxembourg's goal tally first, score column indicates score after each Thill goal.

External links

References

1996 births
Living people
Sportspeople from Luxembourg City
Luxembourgian footballers
Association football midfielders
Luxembourg international footballers
Luxembourg National Division players
Russian Premier League players
Ukrainian Premier League players
TFF First League players
FC Progrès Niederkorn players
FC Ufa players
FC Vorskla Poltava players
Eyüpspor footballers
Luxembourgian expatriate footballers
Expatriate footballers in Russia
Luxembourgian expatriate sportspeople in Russia
Expatriate footballers in Ukraine
Luxembourgian expatriate sportspeople in Ukraine
Expatriate footballers in Turkey
Luxembourgian expatriate sportspeople in Turkey